Lee County is a county located in the U.S. state of Kentucky. As of the 2020 census, the population was 7,395.  Its county seat is Beattyville. The county was formed in 1870 from parts of Breathitt, Estill, Owsley and Wolfe counties. The county was named for Robert E. Lee.  The area of Kentucky where Lee County is located was a pro-union region of Kentucky but the legislature that created the county was controlled by former Confederates. The town of Proctor, named for the Rev. Joseph Proctor, was the first county seat. The first court was held on April 25, 1870, in the old Howerton House. The local economy at the time included coal mining, salt gathering, timber operations, and various commercial operations. It had a U.S. post office from 1843 until 1918.

The county seat, Beattyville, was first known as Taylor's Landing, as it was a ferry landing on the Kentucky River. It was renamed to Beatty in 1850 after early settler Samuel Beatty. The town incorporated in 1872 as Beattyville and was chosen as the new county seat due to its location on the river, which aided transportation and trade.

Although Lee County had taverns in the 19th century, it was a prohibition or dry county until 2019 when the county voted to go wet. The City of Beattyville and Lee County Fiscal Court established alcoholic sale rules for their jurisdictions including prohibiting sales of alcohol on Sunday.

Geography

Eastern Kentucky Coal Field

Lee County lies within the Eastern Coal Field region of Kentucky.  The very rugged terrain essentially defines the area.  Roughly half of the county lies within the Daniel Boone National Forest.  Timber and coal remain economically significant, as do oil and gas.  Harmful effects from unregulated strip mining and clear cut logging practices are still being corrected.  The proliferation of kudzu, an invasive vine that migrated from the South, has proved difficult to address.  However, the growing environmental movement and the developing tourism industry have created energy to take more action to control this pest.

Adjacent counties
 Powell County  (north)
 Wolfe County  (northeast)
 Breathitt County  (southeast)
 Owsley County  (south)
 Jackson County  (southwest)
 Estill County  (northwest)

National protected area
 Daniel Boone National Forest (part)

Demographics

As of the census of 2000, there were 7,916 people, 2,985 households, and 2,122 families residing in the county. The racial makeup of the county was 95.10% White, 3.79% Black or African American, 0.28% Native American, 0.10% Asian, 0.01% Pacific Islander, 0.06% from other races, and 0.66% from two or more races.  0.37% of the population were Hispanic or Latino of any race.

There were 2,985 households, out of which 32.60% had children under the age of 18 living with them, 54.80% were married couples living together, 12.80% had a female householder with no husband present, and 28.90% were non-families. 26.60% of all households were made up of individuals, and 11.80% had someone living alone who was 65 years of age or older.  The average household size was 2.41 and the average family size was 2.91.

In the county, the population was spread out, with 22.70% under the age of 18, 9.00% from 18 to 24, 30.30% from 25 to 44, 23.60% from 45 to 64, and 14.30% who were 65 years of age or older.  The median age was 37 years. For every 100 females there were 109.40 males.  For every 100 females age 18 and over, there were 111.80 males.

The median income for a household in the county was $18,544, and the median income for a family was $24,918. Males had a median income of $25,930 versus $19,038 for females. The per capita income for the county was $13,325.  About 25.20% of families and 30.40% of the population were below the poverty line, including 41.00% of those under age 18 and 22.90% of those age 65 or over.

Life expectancy
Of 3,142 counties in the United States in 2013, Lee County ranked #3,111 for the life expectancy of males and 2,989 for longevity of females.  Males in Lee County lived an average of 68.5 years and females lived an average of 76.7 years compared to the national average for life expectancy of 76.5 for males and 81.2 for females. Moreover, the average life expectancy  in Lee Country was stable for males and declined by 1.5 years for females between 1985 and 2013, compared to a national average for the same period of an increased life span of 5.5 years for men and 3.1 years for women. High rates of smoking and obesity, and a low level of physical activity appear to be contributing factors to the low life expectancy for both sexes.

Politics

Economy

Lee County, Kentucky is often listed as one of the poorest counties in the United States.  In 2014, 35 percent of its population lived in poverty and the median family income was $23,968 compared to 14.8 percent poor and a $53,482 median family income for the United States as a whole.

Communities

City
 Beattyville (county seat)

Unincorporated communities

 Airedale
 Athol
 Bear Track
 Belle Point
 Canyon Falls
 Congleton
 Cressmont
 Crystal
 Delvinta
 Earnestville
 Enoch
 Evelyn
 Fillmore
 Fincastle
 Fixer
 Greeley
 Heidelberg
 Idamay
 Leeco
 Lower Buffalo
 Maloney
 Monica
 Mount Olive
 Old Landing
 Primrose
 Proctor
 Saint Helens
 Standing Rock
 Tallega
 White Ash
 Williba
 Willow Shoals
 Yellow Rock
 Zacharia
 Zoe

See also

 List of memorials to Robert E. Lee
 National Register of Historic Places listings in Lee County, Kentucky

References

 
1870 establishments in Kentucky
Counties of Appalachia
Kentucky counties
Populated places established in 1870